Liberty High School is a public high school based in Liberty, New York.

Its school gymnasium is most famous for hosting an episode of WWF Monday Night Raw in 1994.

References

Educational institutions in the United States with year of establishment missing
Public high schools in New York (state)
Schools in Sullivan County, New York